Tinsobtinga is a village in the Toece Department of Bazèga Province in central Burkina Faso. The village has an estimated population of 752. (As of 2005)

References

External links
Satellite map at Maplandia.com

Populated places in the Centre-Sud Region
Bazèga Province